Verkhny Muynak (Ürge Muynaq) is a rural locality (a village) and the administrative centre of Muynaksky Selsoviet, Zianchurinsky District, Bashkortostan, Russia. The population was 490 as of 2010. There are 8 streets.

Geography 
Verkhny Muynak is located 25 km southeast of Isyangulovo (the district's administrative centre) by road. Sredny Muynak is the nearest rural locality.

References 

Rural localities in Zianchurinsky District